Gjinaj is a village and a former municipality in the Kukës County, northeastern Albania. At the 2015 local government reform it became a subdivision of the municipality Has. The population at the 2011 census was 1,106.

References 

Former municipalities in Kukës County
Administrative units of Has (municipality)
Villages in Kukës County